Mimusops angel (Canjeel in Somali) is a species of plant in the family Sapotaceae. It is endemic to Somalia, and is threatened by habitat loss. It grows mainly in the Bari region along creeks, locally called biyo mareen or tog, which often flow into the red sea or the indian ocean. The tree is very large and tall making it very noticeable in the horizon. 

It is also an ever-green tree which means it has green leaves all year round. It produces a very sweet fruit which is green initially and characterized by its reddish color when ripe. It also resembles dates and is described as such to those who don't know of it. It can grow up to 30m and has a shade of 20m+. The Dervish leader Sayyid Mohammed Abdulle Hassan impressed with the majestic tree said, a 100 man cavalry can rest in its shade.

References

Flora of Somalia
angel
Near threatened plants
Endemic flora of Somalia
Taxonomy articles created by Polbot